Mr. Justice Maxell is a 1922 thriller novel by the British writer Edgar Wallace. Like several of his books it is partly set in Morocco, where Wallace had previously worked as journalist.

References

Bibliography
 Clark, Neil. Stranger than Fiction: The Life of Edgar Wallace, the Man Who Created King Kong. Stroud, Gloucs.: The History Press, 2015.

1922 British novels
Novels by Edgar Wallace
British thriller novels
Novels set in London
Novels set in Morocco